Flocoumafen is a fluorinated, second-generation anticoagulant of the 4-hydroxycoumarin vitamin K antagonist type. It is a second generation (i.e., high potency) chemical in this class, used commercially as a rodenticide. It has a very high toxicity and is restricted to indoor use and sewers (in the UK). This restriction is mainly due to the increased risk to non-target species, especially due to its tendency to bio-accumulate in exposed organisms. Studies have shown that rodents resistant to first-generation anticoagulants can be adequately controlled with flocoumafen. It was synthesized in 1984 by Shell International Chemical.

Toxicity 
To most rodents  is 1 mg/kg, but it can vary a lot between species: from 0.12 mg/kg: Microtus arvalis to more than 10 mg/kg Acomys cahirinus. For dogs: 0.075 - 0.25 mg/kg.

Antidote 
Antidote is vitamin K1.

References

External link 
 ICSC: Flocoumafen
PubChem: Flocoumafen
Kyoto Encyclopedia of Genes and Genomes (KEGG): Flocoumafen
ChemBlink: Flocoumafen

Rodenticides
Phenol ethers
Trifluoromethyl compounds
Chromones
Tetralins
Phenols
Vitamin K antagonists
Anticoagulant rodenticides
4-Hydroxycoumarins